Felipe López (born 14 May 1969) is a Guatemalan cyclist. He competed in the men's individual road race at the 1996 Summer Olympics.

References

External links
 

1969 births
Living people
Guatemalan male cyclists
Olympic cyclists of Guatemala
Cyclists at the 1996 Summer Olympics
Place of birth missing (living people)